Mason Hill is a summit located in Adirondack Mountains of New York located in the Town of Hope south of the hamlet of Hope Falls.

References

Mountains of Hamilton County, New York
Mountains of New York (state)